The 2005 Iowa Hawkeyes football team represented the University of Iowa during the 2005 NCAA Division I-A football season. The Hawkeyes played their home games at Kinnick Stadium in Iowa City, Iowa and were coached by Kirk Ferentz.

Iowa finished the season 7–5, including a record of 5–3 in the Big Ten Conference.  Despite an up-and-down season, the Hawkeyes were invited to a January bowl game in Florida for the fourth consecutive year.

Preseason
After three consecutive seasons with at least 10 wins and co-Big Ten championships in 2002 and 2004, expectations were high. A thrilling last second victory over LSU in the Capital One Bowl capped a 10-2 campaign with eight consecutive victories.  With the return of first-team All-Big Ten quarterback Drew Tate, and first-team All-Big Ten linebackers Abdul Hodge and Chad Greenway (a preseason All-American) anchoring the defense, the Hawkeyes were considered national title contenders by some publications. Indeed, the presence of a running game (the Hawkeyes ranked 115th nationally in rushing in 2004 due to injuries) was thought to make Iowa even stronger.  The Hawkeyes entered the season ranked 11th in the AP Poll (10th in the Coaches' Poll), their highest preseason ranking in two decades.

Schedule

Roster

Coaching staff

Rankings

Game summaries

Ball State

Source: Box Score
    
    
    
    
    
    
    
    

The Hawkeyes opened the much anticipated 2005 season against a Cardinals team that had 13 players suspended for the game. This one was over early as the Hawks raced to a 28-0 lead after one quarter. Iowa extended the advantage to 49-0 by halftime and cruised from there. Dating back to last season, this was the 9th consecutive win for the Hawkeyes.

at Iowa State

Source: Box Score

Northern Iowa

Source: Box Score

at Ohio State

Source: Box Score

Illinois

Source: Box Score
    
    
    
    
    
    

Illinois was able to drive the ball but Iowa limited them to just one touchdown in this homecoming game. Albert Young was a force on the ground rushing for over 100 yards with nearly eight yards a carry. One of the most memorable plays of the contest came on the Hawkeyes second touchdown as Ed Hinkel took a reverse 20 yards in for a score, jumping over an Illinois defender in the process. Kenny Iwebema also blocked two Illini field goals in the first half.

at Purdue

Source: Box Score
    
    
    
    
    
    
    
    
    
    
    

Both Drew Tate and Clinton Solomon had career games in this blowout on the road. Tate had over 350 yards passing with Solomon compiling 166 of them as Purdue had no answer for him.

Indiana

Source: Box Score

Michigan

Source: Box Score
    
    
    
    
    
    
    
    

An overtime loss to the Wolverines snapped the Hawkeyes school-record 22-game winning streak at Kinnick Stadium.

at Northwestern

Source: Box Score
    
    
    
    
    
    
    
    
    

Albert Young rushed for 202 yards and 2 touchdowns, but it wasn't enough for the Hawkeyes. After leading 24-7 at half and 27-14 after a Kyle Schlicher field goal with 10:58 remaining in the game, Iowa surrendered the lead and the game when the Wildcats scored a touchdown with 42 seconds left.

at Wisconsin

Source: Box Score
    
    
    
    
    
    

 

In the final match-up of two former Hayden Fry assistant coaches, Kirk Ferentz prevailed to foil Barry Alvarez's home finale. Iowa's defense was smothering in this contest, holding the Badgers to their end of the field for the majority of the game.

Minnesota

Source: Box Score
    
    
    
    
    
    
    
    
    
    
    
    

The Hawkeyes rolled to 613 yards of total offense in a blowout win on Senior Day. Iowa raced to a 35-0 lead and never looked back in retaining Floyd of Rosedale. Running backs Damian Sims and Albert Young both rushed for more than 100 yards. Wide receiver Ed Hinkel capped his home career in grand style with four touchdown receptions, tying a school record and setting the Kinnick Stadium record. He finished the game with 151 yards on seven receptions.

vs. Florida (Outback Bowl)

Source: Box Score
    
    
    
    
    
    
    
    
    

Despite allowing a blocked punt for a touchdown, an interception return for a touchdown, and an acrobatic catch for a touchdown with 0:01 before halftime, the Hawkeyes gave themselves a chance late in the game – one that ended in controversy.  Iowa kicked a field goal with 1:24 left in the 4th quarter, which brought the game to a one possession lead by Florida.  Iowa attempted an onside kick, and recovered the ball.  However, flags were down, with the call being offsides against Iowa, giving the ball back to Florida.  However, replays clearly showed no one offsides, even being pointed out by commentators.  "Challenges" were not allowed in college football at this time, so Iowa had no way of arguing the questionable call.

Postseason awards
Chad Greenway - First-team All-American

Team players in the 2006 NFL draft

References

Iowa
Iowa Hawkeyes football seasons
Iowa Hawkeyes football